H & Claire were a pop duo, consisting of Steps members Claire Richards and Ian "H" Watkins. They scored three top 10 hits on the UK Singles Chart in 2002.

Career
Following the split of Steps on 26 December 2001, H & Claire formed the duo. The pair released their debut single "DJ" on WEA Records on 6 May 2002. The single debuted and peaked on the UK Singles Chart at number 3, spending a week in the top 10.

Their second single, "Half a Heart" followed on 12 August 2002, peaking at number 8. Their third and final single release was a double A-side of an original song entitled "All Out of Love" and a cover of the Disney song "Beauty and the Beast". The single was released in November 2002 and peaked at number 10, spending three weeks on the UK top 40. Their debut album, Another You Another Me, followed. However, it peaked at number 58 on the UK Albums Chart, and WEA Records soon dropped the pair.

Following the release of the group's debut album, they were set to go back into the studio to record new material after Richards' wedding, although that never materialized following Richards retiring from the public eye meaning the band disbanding in 2003.

In May 2011, the duo reunited with their original group Steps.

In November 2020, a collection of B-Sides, along with remix bundles for the album's three singles, were uploaded to streaming services to mark the 18th anniversary of Another You Another Me.

Discography

Albums

Singles

Music videos

References

 
 

English pop music duos
Male–female musical duos
Musical groups established in 2002
Musical groups disestablished in 2003
Steps (group)
2002 establishments in the United Kingdom